Sturla may refer to:

Places
 Sturla, a neighbourhood of Genoa, Italy

People
given name
 Sturla Ásgeirsson (born 1980), an Icelandic handball player
 Sturla Böðvarsson (born 1945), an Icelandic politician, President of the Althing
 Sturla Sighvatsson (1199 – 1238), an Icelandic chieftain of the Sturlungar family clan 
 Sturla Þórðarson (1214 – 1284), an Icelandic writer and skald
surname
 Daniel Sturla, SDB (born 1959), a Uruguayan Roman Catholic cleric, archbishop of Montevideo
 Eduardo Sturla (born 1974), an Argentine triathlete 
 Gérard Sturla (1930 – 2006), a French basketball player 
 Héctor Martín Sturla (1953 - 1991), a Uruguayan lawyer and politician
 Salvador Sturla (1891 – 1975), a Dominican musician and composer